Visual Concepts Entertainment is an American video game developer based in Novato, California. Founded in May 1988, the company is best known for developing sports games in the 2K franchise, most recently NBA 2K and WWE 2K, and previously NFL 2K and College Hoops 2K. Visual Concepts was acquired by Sega in May 1999 and sold to Take-Two Interactive in January 2005. The acquisition of the company led Take-Two Interactive to open their 2K label which Visual Concepts became part of, on the day following the acquisition.

Visual Concepts operates nine studios (in Agoura Hills, Austin, Budapest, Foothill Ranch, Novato, Parksville, San Jose, Seoul and Shanghai.) As of December 2018, the company employs more than 350 people.

History 

Visual Concepts was founded in 1988 by programmer Scott Patterson and brothers Greg and Jeff Thomas, and was originally based in a small office above a bank in Novato, California. On January 25, 1995, Electronic Arts announced that they had acquired a stake in the company. In September 1997, Sega announced their intentions to acquire the company; the deal was closed on May 18, 1999, and Visual Concepts switched ownership for an undisclosed sum.

Following a June 2004 deal between Sega and Take-Two Interactive, wherein the two would co-publish and distribute titles in Visual Concepts' ESPN-based game series, rumors started spreading in December 2004, which suggested that Take-Two Interactive was planning to acquire Visual Concepts from Sega. The publisher's 2006 Form 10-K filing later showed that a total of  had been paid to Sega for the acquisition of Visual Concepts and affiliated properties by January 2006. On January 25, 2005, the day following the acquisition, Take-Two Interactive announced their new publishing label, 2K, which would henceforth manage Visual Concepts and Kush Games.

A March 2009 research study on Metacritic scores, conducted by GameQuarry, ranked Visual Concepts as the number one "most consistent" video game developer on the review aggregator website, with 50 out of their 72 games at the time having received an aggregated review score of 80/100 or higher. In August 2010, Visual Concepts laid off 30 employees due to "the need for resource alignment and better efficiency". In December 2018, at The Game Awards 2018, Greg Thomas was honored with the "Industry Icon" award for his 30-year services with Visual Concepts.

2K acquired HookBang's game division, which had worked with Visual Concepts on the NBA 2K games previously, in March 2021. The division was rebranded as Visual Concepts Austin to continue to support Visual Concepts.

Games developed

1989–2004

2005–present

References

External links 
 

1988 establishments in California
1999 mergers and acquisitions
2005 mergers and acquisitions
2K (company)
American companies established in 1988
Companies based in Marin County, California
Novato, California
Software companies based in the San Francisco Bay Area
Take-Two Interactive divisions and subsidiaries
Video game companies based in California
Video game companies established in 1988
Video game development companies